State Route 178 (SR-178) is a state highway in the U.S. state of Utah. Spanning just  in Payson, it connects Interstate 15 to SR-198.

Route description

State Route 178, a minor arterial connector, starts at Interstate 15's southbound ramp for exit 248, a diamond interchange. The route proceeds east on 800 South, over the interchange, continuing through Payson until terminatining  at SR-198.

History
State Route 178 was added to the state highway system in 2000 in exchange for transferring ownership of the western portion of SR-147 from the Utah Department of Transportation to the city of Payson, as SR-178 connected to Interstate 15 and would be a more appropriate road for the state highway system. No changes have been made to the highway since.

Major intersections

References

178
 178
Streets in Utah